Robin Renee Pingeton (née Becker; born July 9, 1968) is the head coach of the University of Missouri's women's basketball team. She was hired in April 2010 to replace former head coach Cindy Stein.

Career as player

College
Pingeton graduated in 1990 from Saint Ambrose University. She remains the school's all-time leading scorer with 2,502 points.  She also earned All-America honors in softball and basketball.

WBA
Pingeton played three seasons of professional basketball in the Women's Basketball Association.

Career as coach
Before coming to Missouri, Pingeton was the head women's basketball coach at Illinois State University.  She also was the head coach at her alma mater, Saint Ambrose University.

Personal life 
Pingeton and her husband, Rich, have two children, a son born in 2006 and a son born in 2011.

Head coaching record

References

1968 births
Living people
American women's basketball coaches
Basketball coaches from Iowa
Illinois State Redbirds women's basketball coaches
Iowa State Cyclones women's basketball coaches
Missouri Tigers women's basketball coaches
St. Ambrose Queen Bees basketball coaches
St. Ambrose Queen Bees basketball players